MIPS-X is a reduced instruction set computer (RISC) microprocessor and instruction set architecture (ISA) developed as a follow-on project to the MIPS project at Stanford University by the same team that developed MIPS. The project, supported by the Defense Advanced Research Projects Agency (DARPA), began in 1984, and its final form was described in a set of papers released in 1986–87. Unlike its older cousin, MIPS-X was never commercialized as a workstation central processing unit (CPU), and has mainly been seen in embedded system designs based on chips designed by Integrated Information Technology (IIT) for use in digital video applications.

MIPS-X, while designed by the same team and architecturally very similar, is instruction-set incompatible with the mainline MIPS architecture R-series processors. The MIPS-X processor is obscure enough that, as of November 20, 2005, support for it is provided only by specialist developers (such as Green Hills Software), and is notably missing from the GNU Compiler Collection (GCC).

MIPS-X has become important among DVD player firmware hackers, since many DVD players (especially low-end devices) use chips based on the IIT design (and produced by ESS Technology), as their central processor. Devices such as the ESS VideoDrive system on a chip (SoC) also include a digital signal processor (DSP) (coprocessor) for decoding MPEG audio and video streams.

External links
 The original MIPS-X paper from Stanford

Instruction set architectures
MIPS architecture
Stanford University
32-bit microprocessors